The Confitería del Molino is an historical Art Nouveau style confitería (coffeehouse) in Buenos Aires, Argentina, located in front of the Palace of the National Congress and the Congressional Plaza, on the intersection of Callao and Rivadavia avenues in the barrio of Balvanera.

It first opened on 9 July 1916 and closed in 1997, the year when it was declared a National Historic Monument by the Argentine Congress. In recent years it has become dilapidated and derelict. In 2014, a law passed by Congress expropriated the coffeehouse and mandated its restoration; restoration efforts began in 2016 and are, as of 2022, nearing completion

History
Cayetano Brenna, a famous confectioner, commissioned Italian architect Francisco Gianotti in 1915 to design the building that would house a café on its ground floor. The café itself opened on July 9, 1916, and when completed in 1917 the building became one of the tallest in the city with a corner turret rising . Illuminated from the inside with electric lighting, the turret featured stained glass windows and decorative windmill sails. El Molino and Galería Güemes were two of Gianotti's greatest works and represent important examples of Art Nouveau style architecture in Buenos Aires.

Cayetano Brenna died in 1938 and Renato Varesse took over the business until 1950, when Antonio Armentano appeared, who in turn sold the goodwill in 1978. The new owners cause the bankruptcy of the confectionery, which happens to be acquired by Brenna's grandchildren, who introduce a series of improvements to adapt it to the new times.

Over the years El Molino became a favourite meeting place for local cultural, business, and political figures. The café was closed on 23 February 1997 and, neglected by its owners and abandoned in general, it slowly deteriorated until it was evident considerable restoration efforts were needed to salvage the building.

The Confitería del Molino was declared a National Historic Monument in 1997. Congress approved its purchase by the Argentine Government in a bill passed unanimously on November 12, 2014. Plans include the restoration of the building and reopening of the namesake café, as well as the creation of a museum of early 20th century life in Buenos Aires. Officially, the building will be an annex of the Argentine Congress serving numerous functions and administered through a bicameral commission (the Special Bicameral Administrative Commission on the "Edificio del Molino"; Law 27.009), though the coffee shop itself is to be operated by the private sector.

Illustrious visitors

In popular culture 
In 1996, American entertainer Madonna recorded the videoclip of her cover of Love Don't Live Here Anymore in the main hall of the coffeehouse.
The 1996 movie Autumn Sun, has scenes filmed in the place.

Views

Bibliography 
 Mimi Böhm, Buenos Aires, Art Nouveau, Ediciones Xavier Verstraeten, Buenos Aires, 2005.
 Monumentos Históricos Nacionales y Bienes Declarados de la República Argentina, Comisión Nacional de Museos y de Monumentos y Lugares Históricos de la República Argentina, Edición 2008.

References

External links

Official website of the Confitería del Molino (in Spanish)

Balvanera
Buildings and structures in Buenos Aires
National Historic Monuments of Argentina
Coffeehouses and cafés in Argentina
Buildings and structures completed in 1917
Art Nouveau architecture in Buenos Aires
Art Nouveau restaurants
Art Nouveau apartment buildings